Reynaldo Antonio Hernández Villegas (born September 11, 1984, in Concepción Batres) is a Salvadoran former footballer. He was banned for life in 2013, for match-fixing while playing for the El Salvador national football team.

Club career
Hernández started his professional career with club C.D. Guerrero in 2005, joined Primera División de Fútbol de El Salvador (La Primera) club Vista Hermosa in 2006, and moved to La Primera club C.D. Águila in 2012.

International career
Hernández made his debut with the Salvadoran senior team on May 30, 2009, in a match against Jamaica at RFK Stadium, Washington, D.C. Although he played most of the game, he was subbed four minutes before the final whistle. The game ended with a scoreless draw.

As of August 2011, he has earned a total of 10 caps (scoring no goals) and has represented his country at the 2011 CONCACAF Gold Cup.

On September 20, 2013, Hernández was one of 14 Salvadoran players banned for life due to their involvement with match fixing.

International caps and goals
El Salvador's goal tally first.

References

External links

1984 births
Living people
People from Usulután Department
Association football defenders
Salvadoran footballers
El Salvador international footballers
2011 Copa Centroamericana players
2011 CONCACAF Gold Cup players
C.D. Vista Hermosa footballers
Sportspeople involved in betting scandals
Sportspeople banned for life